The 1990 Dow Classic was a women's tennis tournament played on outdoor grass courts that was part of Tier IV of the 1990 WTA Tour. It was the 9th edition of the event. It took place at the Edgbaston Priory Club in Birmingham, United Kingdom, from 11 June until 17 June 1990. Zina Garrison won the singles title.

Entrants

Seeds

Other entrants
The following players received wildcards into the main draw:
  Sara Gomer
  Samantha Smith
  Clare Wood

The following players received entry from the qualifying draw:
  Carin Bakkum
  Jill Hetherington
  Kathy Jordan
  Maria Lindström
  Heather Ludloff
  Julie Richardson
  Julie Salmon
  Catherine Suire

Finals

Singles

 Zina Garrison defeated  Helena Suková 6–4, 6–1
 It was Garrison's first title of the year and the 10th of her career.

Doubles

 Larisa Savchenko-Neiland /  Natalia Zvereva defeated  Lise Gregory /  Gretchen Magers 3–6, 6–3, 6–3
 It was Savchenko-Neiland's first doubles title of the year and the 15th of her career. It was Zvereva's first doubles title of the year and the 8th of her career.

External links
 1990 Dow Classic Draws
 ITF Tournament Page

Dow Classic
Birmingham Classic (tennis)
Dow lassic
Dow Classic